Dr. Henry Spence Cobblestone Farmhouse and Barn Complex is a historic home located at Starkey in Yates County, New York.  The farmhouse was built about 1848 and is a massive -story, five-bay, center hall building decorated with elements associated with the Greek Revival style.  The cobblestone house is built of small, reddish lake washed cobbles. The farmhouse is among the nine surviving cobblestone buildings in Yates County.  Also on the property are the remains of six contributing support structures.

It was listed on the National Register of Historic Places in 1992.

References

Houses on the National Register of Historic Places in New York (state)
Cobblestone architecture
Houses completed in 1848
Houses in Yates County, New York
National Register of Historic Places in Yates County, New York
Barns on the National Register of Historic Places in New York (state)